Themis Tzanetis (born 10 January 1969) is a retired Greek football defender.

References

1969 births
Living people
Greek footballers
Panionios F.C. players
Kalamata F.C. players
PAS Giannina F.C. players
Fostiras F.C. players
Thrasyvoulos F.C. players
Super League Greece players
Association football defenders